The 1928 BYU Cougars football team was an American football team that represented Brigham Young University (BYU) as a member of the Rocky Mountain Conference (RMC) during the Rocky Mountain Conference (RMC) during the 1928 college football season. In their first season under head coach G. Ott Romney, the Cougars compiled an overall record of 3–3–1 with a mark of 1–3–1 against conference opponents, finished tenth in the RMC, and outscored opponents by a total of 75 to 56.

Schedule

References

BYU
BYU Cougars football seasons
BYU Cougars football